This is a list of published books about mushrooms and mycology, including their history in relation to man, their identification, their usage as food and medicine, and their ecology.

Identification guides
These are larger works that may be hard to take on a hike but help with in depth identification after mushroom hunting.

Europe

These are identification guides relevant only to Europe.

North America

These are identification guides relevant only to North America. Below are sections detailing specific regions of North America, such as the Southeastern United States and the Pacific Northwest.

Alaska

Northeastern United States
These are identification guides relevant to the Northeastern United States.

Midwestern United States
These are identification guides relevant to the Midwestern United States.

Pacific Northwest
These are identification guides focused on mushrooms found in the Pacific Northwest.

Southwestern United States
These are identification guides relevant to the Southwestern United States.

Southeastern United States
These are guides relevant to the Southeastern United States.

Field guides

These are identification guides small enough to take with you while mushroom hunting or on a hike.
 
 
 
 
 Smith, Alexander and Weber, Nancy (1980).  The Mushroom Hunter's Field Guide.  Ann Arbor, MI: University of Michigan Press.  .
 Russel, Bill. (2006). Field Guide to Wild Mushrooms of Pennsylvania and the Mid-Atlantic. University Park, PA. University of Pennsylvania Press. ISBN 0-271-02891-2.

Cultivation
These are books about growing mushrooms and fungiculture.

Fungal biology
These are books about mycology and fungal biology.

Ecology
These are books related to the intersection of fungi and ecology, such as mycoremediation.

Food
These are books that explore mushrooms and fungi from the perspective of food and food science, e.g. books that explore the chemical and nutritional compositions of edible mushrooms, or books of recipes specializing in using wild mushrooms.
 
 Johnston, Ruth (2012).  The Art of Cooking Morels. Ann Arbor, MI: University of Michigan Press. .
 
 Kuo, Michael (2007).  100 Edible Mushrooms.  Ann Arbor: University of Michigan Press.  .

Health
These are books concerned with the health benefits of medicinal mushrooms.

History

Catalogs
These are books that don't act primarily as an identification guides but rather as catalogs, e.g. as a book of images of mushrooms with brief descriptions, or as a book listing species for a specific area without identifying information, etc.

Dictionaries and glossaries
These are books that define some of the technical jargon used within the field of mycology.

See also
 List of mycologists

References

External links
 Cumberland Mycological Society Book Reviews
 Asheville Mushroom Club Book List
 /r/mycology's list of books and resources

Biology books
Mycological literature
Mushrooms